Donald Cameron of Lochiel  (5 April 1835 – 30 November 1905) was a British Conservative politician, diplomat and courtier. He was an ambassador of the Elgin embassy to China and later sat in the House of Commons from 1868 to 1885 and served as Lord Lieutenant of Inverness from 1887. Cameron was Groom-in-Waiting for Queen Victoria between 1874 and 1880. 

He was the 24th Lochiel of Clan Cameron.

Early life 
Donald Cameron was born in Richmond, Surrey, the eldest son of Captain Donald Cameron, 23rd Lochiel and Vere Catherine Louisa Hobart, daughter of Hon. George Vere Hobart. His mother, sister of the 5th Earl of Buckinghamshire and a cousin of Charles Stuart, Baron Stuart de Rothesay, was a close friend of Anne Lister. Lochaber joyously celebrated the birth of Cameron during the spring of 1835, with commemorative dinners held by Camerons "from Ballachulish Ferry to the Marches of Knoydart", as well as the lighting of bonfires on many prominent peaks, including Ben Nevis.  

Like his father, Cameron was educated at Harrow. At an early age rather than joining the army, he entered into diplomatic service in Europe and the Far East.

Career 
Cameron succeeded his father as Chief of the Camerons in 1858. He was employed in the diplomatic service and was First attache for the Earl of Elgin’s special embassy to the Qing dynasty in China during the Second Opium War. He was then at the British Embassy in Berlin where he met with Otto von Bismarck. Cameron then retired from the foreign office service and made Achnacarry Castle his permanent home. He was the first chief to do so since the famous Gentle Lochiel gazed upon the burnt out ruins of the castle over a century earlier. Cameron was a Justice of the peace for Buckinghamshire and a deputy lieutenant (later Lord Lieutenant) for Inverness. At the 1868 general election Cameron was elected Member of Parliament for Inverness-shire and sat in the House of Commons. He held the seat until 1885. 

Lochiel served as a royal courtier and was groom-in-waiting to Queen Victoria from 1874 to 1880. From 1887 he held the office of Lord Lieutenant of Inverness-shire and Justice of the peace. 

Active in sheep farming, Cameron had to take on the stakes of most of the sheep farms on the Estate during the acute depression in the industry. As such, he had an intimate knowledge of the shepherds plight, and that of the related business of deer stalking. He was appointed in 1883 to the Napier Association, to enquire into the grievances of the Crofters, and was later named to the Deer Forest Commission in 1894.

Marriage and children 

In 1875, Cameron married the Scottish noblewoman Lady Margaret Elizabeth Montagu Douglas Scott, daughter of Walter Montagu Douglas Scott, 5th Duke of Buccleuch and Lady Charlotte Thynne, daughter of Isabella Byng. They had the following issue:

 Col. Sir Donald Walter Cameron, 25th Lochiel (born 1876), married Lady Hermione Emily Graham, and was the father of Donald Hamish Cameron, 26th Lochiel
 Cpt. Ewan Charles Cameron (born 1878)
 Allan George Cameron (born 1880; died 1914)
 Archibald Cameron (born 1886; died 1917 at Arras)
All of Cameron's sons would serve in the British army during the First World War; two of them were killed.

Commemoration 
Cameron is commemorated with a statue as Dòmhnall Camshron mac Dhòmhnaill Dubh in full Highland regalia in Fort William, Highland on the Parade, erected circa 1905. Tribute to a man who faithfully served both Lochaber and his clan during his lifetime.

In fiction 
Cameron features as a main character in the romance novel Her Heart for a Compass by Sarah, Duchess of York. The novel is a fictional account of the life of Lady Margaret Montagu Douglas Scott, Lochiel's wife.

References

External links 
 
 XXIV Chief: Donald Cameron of Lochiel, M.P.

1835 births
1905 deaths
Lord-Lieutenants of Inverness-shire
British diplomats
Members of the Parliament of the United Kingdom for Highland constituencies
UK MPs 1868–1874
UK MPs 1874–1880
UK MPs 1880–1885
Donald
Lochiel, Donald Cameron, 7th Lord
Scottish Tory MPs (pre-1912)